A list of animated feature films first released in 1979.

Highest-grossing animated films of the year

See also
 List of animated television series of 1979

References

Feature films
1979
1979-related lists